Gilly in Prague for the First Time is a 1920 Czechoslovak comedy film directed by Karel Lamač.

Cast
Václav Pražský as  Gilly
Anny Ondra as  Girl (as Anny Ondráková)
Karel Lamač as  Uncle Hron

References

External links
 

1920 films
1920 comedy films
Czechoslovak black-and-white films
Czech silent films
Films directed by Karel Lamač
Czechoslovak comedy films